Andrea Venier (fl. 15th century) was a 15th-century notable member of the Venier family.

In 1422 he was Venetian chamberlain in Scutari and after some time he was appointed as chief magistrate of Antivari (modern day Bar in Montenegro). In 1441 Venier became a castellan of Scutari in Venetian Albania and by July 1448, during the Albanian-Venetian War (1447-1448), he was the provveditore of Venetian Albania. He played an important role in relations between Skanderbeg and Venetian Republic.

In August 1457 Venetians recaptured Dagnum from Dukagjini after fierce battle and significant casualties. Venetian forces led by Venier were supported by Skanderbeg. In 1458, together with Francesco Venier and Malchiore Da Imola, Andrea prepared plans for the reinforcement of the castle in Scutari. The Venetian Senate consulted Venier regarding its politics in Albania.

References

Sources 
 

Castellans
Venetian period in the history of Albania
Andrea
Venetian governors
Republic of Venice military personnel
15th-century Venetian people